The 2004–05 season was the 59th season in Rijeka's history. It was their 14th season in the Prva HNL and 31st successive top tier season.

Competitions

Prva HNL

First stage

Second stage (championship play-off)

Results summary

Results by round

Matches

Prva HNL

Source: HRnogomet.com

Croatian Cup

Source: HRnogomet.com

UEFA Cup

Source: HRnogomet.com

Squad statistics
Competitive matches only.  Appearances in brackets indicate numbers of times the player came on as a substitute.

See also
2004–05 Prva HNL
2004–05 Croatian Cup
2004–05 UEFA Cup

References

External sources
 2004–05 Prva HNL at HRnogomet.com
 2004–05 Croatian Cup at HRnogomet.com 
 Prvenstvo 2004.-2005. at nk-rijeka.hr

HNK Rijeka seasons
Rijeka